Roberto Fernández Urbieta (born 7 June 2000), is a Paraguayan professional footballer who plays as a defender for Russian club Dynamo Moscow.

Career
Fernández is a youth product of Guaraní, having joined their youth academy at the age of 13. He began playing with their senior side in 2019 in the Paraguayan Primera División.

On 26 July 2022, Fernández signed a five-year contract with Russian Premier League club Dynamo Moscow.

International career
Fernández is a youth international for Paraguay, and captained the Paraguay U17s at the 2017 FIFA U-17 World Cup.

Career statistics

Club

References

External links

2000 births
Living people
People from Concepción, Paraguay
Paraguayan footballers
Paraguay youth international footballers
Association football defenders
Club Guaraní players
FC Dynamo Moscow players
Paraguayan Primera División players
Russian Premier League players
Paraguayan expatriate footballers
Expatriate footballers in Russia
Paraguayan expatriate sportspeople in Russia